Deh Sheykh Morghazi (also Romanized as Deh Sheykh Morghazī; also known as Dehsheykh) is a village in Khatunabad Rural District, in the Central District of Jiroft County, Kerman Province, Iran. At the 2006 census, its population was 646, in 142 families.

References 

Populated places in Jiroft County